The year 2011 is the 4th year in the history of Jewels, a mixed martial arts promotion based in Japan. In 2011 Jewels held 4 events beginning with, Jewels 13th Ring & 14th Ring.

Title fights

Events list

Jewels 12th Ring

Jewels 12th Ring was a cancelled event that would have been held on March 11, 2011 at Shinjuku Face in Tokyo, Japan.

Jewels 13th Ring & 14th Ring

Jewels 13th Ring and Jewels 14th Ring were events held on May 14, 2011 at Shin-Kiba 1st Ring in Tokyo, Japan.

Jewels 13th Ring Results

Jewels 14th Ring Results

Jewels 15th Ring

Jewels 15th Ring was an event held on July 9, 2011 at Shinjuku Face in Tokyo, Japan.

Results

Jewels 16th Ring

Jewels 16th Ring was an event held on September 11, 2011 at Shin-Kiba 1st Ring in Tokyo, Japan.

Results

Jewels 17th Ring

Jewels 17th Ring was an event held on December 17, 2011 at Shinjuku Face in Tokyo, Japan.

Results

Notes

References

Jewels (mixed martial arts) events
2011 in mixed martial arts